Hirwaun is a village and community at the north end of the Cynon Valley in the County Borough of Rhondda Cynon Taf, South Wales. It is  NW of the town of Aberdare, and comes under the Aberdare post town. At the 2001 census, Hirwaun had a population of 4,851. increasing at the 2011 census to 4,990. The village is on the Heads of the Valleys Road and at the southern edge of the Brecon Beacons National Park.

Etymology
Hirwaun (also formerly spelled as Hirwain and Herwain) derives from two common Welsh toponyms "Hir" meaning long and "Gwaun" meaning moorland.

Writing in 1887,  Thomas Morgan stated that the correct name is Hirwaun Gwrgant, meaning Gwrgan's "Waun". This name comes from its association with Gwrgan ab Ithel (1033 - 1070), a king of Morgannwg who is said to have freely given a portion of the waun (named "Y Waun Hir") to his poor subjects and all other Welshmen for raising corn, and the breeding of sheep and cattle. Morgan further states that in olden times the waun extended from Blaengwrach (near Rhydgroes) to Mountain Ash, a length of nearly ten miles.

History and background
Hirwaun has an industrial background centred around the Hirwaun Ironworks.  After the ironworks closed, coal mining continued, and was a major employer until the second half of the 20th century.

The Crawshay family were powerful, almost all-powerful in the production of steel, and the Hirwaun Ironworks had produced cannons used on HMS Victory. The family owned a large portion of Hirwaun and even used their own currency, the "Hirwaun Guinea", to pay employees, a form of truck system which stopped employees travelling to Cardiff or spending their money outside the controlled economy of the village.

Following the miners' strike, the only deep coal mine left in Wales was Tower Colliery, which closed down, was bought by its workers and reopened.

Industry
Anthony Bacon started iron production at Cyfarthfa in 1765. His business partner, Francis Homfray, ran the works during the Napoleonic Wars. The finished product was transported to the port of Cardiff by mules and pack-horses. The works later passed through a succession of owners before being purchased in 1819 by William Crawshay of Cyfarthfa. Crawshay expanded the works, leading to a population influx into the locality. By 1830, nearly 900 men were employed at the Hirwaun works, and in the same year the first railway steam engine seen in the locality began to operate from the works. The ironworks remained in family hands until its closure in 1859. The ironworks' blast furnaces required coke, which spurred an increase in local coal mining.

Government
Hirwaun had its own seat on Glamorgan County Council from 1889. The first member elected was Sir William Thomas Lewis, later Lord Merthyr. Hirwaun was also part of the Aberdare Urban District Council area.

Until 2022 Hirwaun was the name of an electoral ward to Rhondda Cynon Taf County Borough Council, electing one county borough councillor. Following a boundary review, it was merged with neighbouring Rhigos to become 'Hirwaun, Penderyn and Rhigos', electing two councillors.

Gallery

Religion

St Lleurwg's Church
Saint Lleurwg's parish church is in the centre of the village, in the ecclesiastical parish of Hirwaun. It was opened by Alfred Ollivant,  Bishop of Llandaff in July 1858. The sister church in the parish, in Penywaun, is dedicated to Saint Winefred.

Saint Therese Of Lisieux Church
The first Roman Catholic Church was established in the Mission Room overlooking the Iron Works (built 1880 demolished in 1969).  The present day church was built in 1965.

Nonconformist chapels
There were a number of nonconformist chapels in Hirwaun village, most dating from its early days as an industrial settlement when large numbers of people arrived from rural Wales. The chapels included Ramoth (Baptist), Nebo (Congregationalist) and Soar (Wesleyan Methodist).

During the 1904-05 Religious Revival, Evan Roberts, the main instigator of the movement, visited the village.

Architecture
Unlike most South Wales Coalfield villages, Hirwaun has an array of different architectural housing styles, often cheek-by-jowl in small blocks. This is due to developments to satisfy different needs at different times, with much gentrification in the last few decades. So Hirwaun has a discontinuous, hotch-potch feel to it that marks it out as unusual in the South Wales Valleys.

The tower blocks
Hirwaun made local news in May 2004 when its two 1960s-built tower blocks were demolished by dynamite detonation. Their demise marked the end of a major landmark in the Cynon Valley and was symptomatic of a broader failure in the design of British public housing.

Hirwaun Common development
Currently the patch of green land known as Hirwaun Common is being strip mined again. This was first done in the 1940s and 1950s.

Transport
The village was originally served by Hirwaun railway station on the Vale of Neath Railway, which arrived in 1851. South of the station were the goods yard and sidings which served the various industries in the area, including Hirwaun Ironworks, Tower Colliery, two brickworks, and Penderyn quarry tramway.

With the Beeching Axe in 1963, the lines south to Neath and north to Merthyr and the former Aberdare Railway were all closed. Hirwaun station was demolished.

After the second closure of Tower in early 2008, in November 2009 the Welsh Assembly Government (WAG) asked Network Rail to conduct a feasibility study on reopening the line to Hirwaun for passenger services. After clearing the line of vegetation, Network Rail submitted its report to WAG. Currently, no decision has been made as to whether the line from Hirwaun to Aberdare will reopen. The Robertstown crossing will be a deciding factor. However, the Welsh Government have added the extension of the line to the map of the South Wales Metro Light Rapid Transit System, which is planned to take over the line from Cardiff Bay to Aberdare and then to Hirwaun.

Sports
Hirwaun Recreational Ground, known locally as the Welfare Ground, is the main sporting facility in the village. The ground has one soccer field, one Rugby Union field, two tennis courts (hard surface) and a bowling green. The ground has its own dedicated floodlit training area.

Rugby
Hirwaun RFC currently play rugby football in the Welsh Rugby Union League (SWALEC League) 3b South Central.

Soccer
Hirwaun has Hirwaun FC (formerly Glancynon FC) playing soccer in the Aberdare Valley Football League premier division.

Squash
The village has a squash team called Hirwaun Squash Federation, formed in 2012. Founded by local lads Greg Williams and Jamie Evans, they play from the local Aberdare Sports Centre and compete in the South Wales Squash Association leagues.

Notable people
See also :Category:People from Hirwaun 
 Gareth Evans, film director

References

Sources

Books and journals

Online

External links

  Hirwaun Historical Society

Villages in Rhondda Cynon Taf
Communities in Rhondda Cynon Taf
Glamorgan electoral wards